Blue Valley Northwest High School (BVNW) is a high school in Overland Park, Kansas, United States. Blue Valley Northwest is one of five high schools operated by Blue Valley USD 229 school district.

Blue Valley Northwest is a member of the Kansas State High School Activities Association and offers a variety of sports programs. Athletic teams compete in the 6A division and are known as the "Huskies". Extracurricular activities are also offered in the form of performing arts, school publications, and clubs.

Academics
Thirteen courses, mainly for motivated freshmen and sophomores, are designated as "Honors" classes. In addition, 17 Advanced Placement courses for college credit are offered. Students taking Honors or Advanced Placement courses receive weighted GPAs.

In 2010, Blue Valley Northwest was selected as one of the six finalists for the first annual Race to the Top High School Commencement Challenge, sponsored by the Department of Education under the Obama administration.

In 2015, Blue Valley Northwest students who attempted the tests achieved an average ACT score of 25.3 out of 36 and an average SAT score of 1879 out of 2400. The class of 2015 also had seven National Merit Finalists and 20 National Advanced Placement Scholars.

Extracurricular activities
The Huskies compete in the Eastern Kansas League and are classified as a 6A-5A school according to the KSHSAA. Throughout its history, Blue Valley Northwest has won several state championships in various sports. Many graduates have gone on to participate in Division I, Division II, and Division III athletics.

State championships

Orchestra
BVNW's orchestra has received a 1 (the best) ranking every year the school has been open.  Students in the orchestra also have auditioned and represented the BVNW in local, state, and national orchestras.

Yearbook and Newspaper
The school's yearbook is called Horizon, the newspaper is called "The Express", the school broadcast news program is called Husky Headlines and the school's literary magazine is called The Muse.

The Horizon and Husky Headlines have been nominated for several Pacemaker awards, and in 2004, the "Horizon" won the Pacemaker Award. The school newspaper, The Express is a member of the High School National Ad Network. At the April 2007 JEA conference in Denver, "The Express" was voted the number one newsmagazine. At the November 2007 JEA conference in Philadelphia, the newsmagazine was rated sixth. In 2015, The Express was nominated for a Pacemaker, but did not win. It did receive sixth place among the competition that year. On November 12, 2016 in Indianapolis, The Express won a Newspaper Pacemaker Award, the first for the publication.

Notable alumni
 Jason Adam, professional baseball player for the Tampa Bay Rays
 Christie Ambrosi, member of the 2000 USA Olympic softball team, who won the gold medal
 Bol Bol, professional basketball player for the Orlando Magic
 Christian Braun, current basketball player for the Denver Nuggets, former Mr. Kansas Basketball and Kansas Gatorade Player of the Year.
 Arash Ferdowsi, co-founder of Dropbox file hosting service
 Lisa Forbes, Miss Kansas USA 2004 and Miss USA Pageant contestant
 Nathaniel Hackett, former head coach of the Denver Broncos
 Zach Hadel (Class of 2011), web animator and co-creator of Smiling Friends for Adult Swim.
 Michael McMillian (Class of 1997), actor known for his roles as Henry Gibson on What I Like About You and Steve Newlin on True Blood
 Dániel Sallói, professional soccer player for Sporting Kansas City

See also
 List of high schools in Kansas
 List of unified school districts in Kansas
Other high schools in Blue Valley USD 229 school district
 Blue Valley High School in Stilwell
 Blue Valley North High School in Overland Park
 Blue Valley West High School in Overland Park
 Blue Valley Southwest High School in Overland Park
 Blue Valley Academy in Overland Park
 High School Confidential

References

External links

 School Website
 Blue Valley USD 229 school district

Public high schools in Kansas
Educational institutions established in 1993
Education in Overland Park, Kansas
Schools in Johnson County, Kansas
1993 establishments in Kansas